Alsager is a civil parish in Cheshire East, England. It contains eight buildings that are recorded in the National Heritage List for England as designated listed buildings. Of these, one is listed at Grade II*, the middle grade, and the others are at Grade II.  The parish is mainly occupied by the town of Alsager, with some surrounding countryside.  The listed buildings include two churches and associated structures, a school and master's house, town houses, farmhouses, and a war memorial

Key

Buildings

References
Citations

Sources

Listed buildings in the Borough of Cheshire East
Lists of listed buildings in Cheshire